{{Infobox company
| name             = Rovira Biscuits Corporation
| logo             = Logo_Rovira_Biscuits_Corporation_en_Ponce,_Puerto_Rico.gif
| caption          = 
| type             = Private
| foundation       = 1929
| traded_as        = 
| fate             = 
| predecessor      = 
| successor        = 
| founder          = José María Rovira Viza
| location_city    = Ponce, Puerto Rico
| location_country =
| locations        = Ponce (2), Guaynabo (1)
| area_served      = Puerto Rico, United States, Caribbean 
| key_people       = Rafael Luis Rovira, CEO
Frances Rovira, vice president Export SalesCarlos Juan Rovira, PresidentJosé Antonio Rovira, board member| industry         = Food
| products         = Crackers
| services         = 
| revenue          = $10 Million +
| operating_income = 
| net_income       = 
| assets           = 
| equity           = 
| owner            = 
| num_employees    = 50
| parent           = Rovira Foods, Inc.
| divisions        = 6
| subsid           = 
| homepage         =  Rovira Biscuits Corporation
| footnotes        = 
}}Rovira Biscuits Corporation' is a Puerto Rican corporation that manufactures crackers branded by the same name.  The company is well known for its production of "export sodas" crackers. The company's headquarters are located in Urbanizacion La Ceiba, barrio San Anton, in the city of Ponce, Puerto Rico, and its main production facilities are located on PR-10 southbound, in barrio Sabanetas, just south of the intersection with PR-52 exit in Ponce, Puerto Rico.

History

The company began in Puerto Rico in 1929 when company founder and Spanish immigrant José María Rovira Viza purchased a small bakery on calle Villa, in downtown Ponce.Rovira History. Rovira Biscuits Corporation. Ponce, Puerto Rico. Retrieved 23 December 2011.  In 1937, José Miguel Rovira, José María Rovira’s son, joined the Company and started the transformation into a crackers manufacturer. During the next decade, and throughout the Second World War, the company expanded its product offerings and facilities.

In 1947, the company became a legally registered corporation in Puerto Rico under the name of Rovira Biscuit Corporation and, in the same year,  it built new manufacturing facilities in Ponce.  In 1952 it moved from its original location in downtown Ponce to the Cuatro Calles sector, near Avenida Las Americas. The new facility provided 50,000 square feet of space. In the early 1950s, further growth allowed the company to start marketing its products to the East Coast of the United States, to satisfy the demand of the large number of Puerto Ricans who had started to migrate there in those years. This was followed by expanding its market to the Caribbean area. In the 1960s, the company added new technology, marketing plans, and management turning "Rovira" into a household name among consumers in Puerto Rico. Also in the 1960s, the company expanded its marketing into areas in the United States beyond the East Coast.

In the 2000s a company spinoff, Rovira Foods, Inc., was established to respond to the growing sales and distribution business in Puerto Rico. It represents the "Rovira" crackers and "Eric’s" snacks brand names in addition to over 10 different product brands in the United States, Spain and Brazil. From this point forward, Rovira Biscuits Corporation, became the manufacturing arm of Rovira Foods, Inc.

In 2009, the company invested $25 million in a new 100,000 square feet corporate facility in the Mercedita sector of Barrio Vayas in Ponce. The company had been operating from a facility one-third that size located in the Cuatro Calles sector of barrio San Antón. The new facility operates 24 hours a day.

Expansion
In addition to its new facility near the intersection of PR-52 and PR-10, Rovira Biscuit Corporation now also operates out of a new facility located on the outskirts of Ponce, close to PR-2. This move is intended to "improve efficiency and production capacity to solidify [the company's] position as the most important cracker manufacturer in Puerto Rico."

Sales and market share
The company has 43% of the cracker business market share of the Island. International exports account for 32% of the company's sales.

Production
The company uses 150,000 pounds (75 tons) of flour every day in its manufacturing of crackers at its 100,000 square feet manufacturing facility.

Leadership
As a private, family business, the company's board of directors consists of Rafael Luis Rovira, president, and Frances Rovira, Carlos Juan Rovira, and José Antonio Rovira, board members.

The leadership structure is as follows:
 Rafael Luis Rovira, Chairman of the Board
 Carlos Juan Rovira, President & CEO, Rovira Biscuit Corporation
 José Antonio Rovira, Director of Corporate Development
 Frances M. Rovira, President & CEO, Rovira Foods, Inc. (distribution)

Legal battle
In 1980 Keebler Corporation sued Rovira alleging illegal used of the words "export sodas" in its labels. The U.S. Court of Appeals decided in favor of Rovira stating that in the minds of Puerto Rican consumers the words "export soda" had come to be associated with the particular type of craker sold by Rovira. The quasi-landmark case was won on the basis that "Rovira's affirmative defense of genericness'' was not barred by the federal rules."

Products
 Export Sodas
 Export Sodas, Integral
 Export Sodas, Lite
 Vanilla Treats
 Treats Crackers
 Tempting Snack Crackers
 Tita Crackers
 100to en boca
 Rositas
 Crack'r Crums

Legacy
Jose Miguel Rovira, the son of founder Jose Maria Rovira and first Ponce-born member of the Rovira family is honored at Ponce's Park of Illustrious Ponce Citizens.

See also

Puerto Rican cuisine

References

Companies based in Ponce, Puerto Rico
1929 establishments in Puerto Rico
Privately held companies of Puerto Rico
Puerto Rican brands
Food and drink companies of Puerto Rico